George Douglas Wallace, Baron Wallace of Coslany (18 April 1906 – 11 November 2003) was a British Labour Party politician.

Wallace was born in Cheltenham and attended Cheltenham Central School. He became an office manager before volunteering to join the RAF in 1941, serving during World War II and rising to the rank of Sergeant.

He was elected as the Member of Parliament (MP) for Chislehurst in 1945 general election. In 1950, Wallace lost to Conservative Dame Patricia Hornsby-Smith by 167 votes. It was 14 years later in 1964 before he returned to Parliament, representing Norwich North. He retired from the House of Commons at the February 1974 election, and became a life peer as  Baron Wallace of Coslany, of Coslany in the City of Norwich, on 17 January 1975.

Wallace served as a Lord-in-waiting from 1977 to 1979, and was a member of the Commonwealth War Graves Commission from 1970 to 1986.

Arms

Footnotes

References

External links 
 

1906 births
2003 deaths
Labour Party (UK) MPs for English constituencies
Labour Party (UK) life peers
Labour Party (UK) Baronesses- and Lords-in-Waiting
UK MPs 1945–1950
UK MPs 1964–1966
UK MPs 1966–1970
UK MPs 1970–1974
UK MPs who were granted peerages
Members of the Fabian Society
Life peers created by Elizabeth II